Happy Campers may refer to:
 Happy Camper, an album from Hoodie Allen
Happy Campers (band), a punk rock band from Las Vegas
Happy Campers (film), 2001 comedy film starring Brad Renfro and Dominique Swain

See also
Happy Camp (disambiguation)